Heinrich Racker (1910, Poland – 28 January 1961, Buenos Aires) was a Polish-Argentine psychoanalyst of Austrian-Jewish origin. Escaping Nazism, he fled to Buenos Aires in 1939. Already a doctor in musicology and philosophy, he became a psychoanalyst, first under the direction of Jeanne Lampl-de Groot, and later working with Ángel Garma and Marie Langer in Argentina. His most important work is a study of the psychoanalytic technique known as transference and countertransference, which was published for the first time in 1968.

His brother, Efraim Racker, was a famous biochemist.

Works
 "Observaciones sobre la contratransferencia como instrumento técnico," Revista de psicoanálisis de la Asociacíon psicoanalítica argentina, 1951
 'A contribution to the problem of countertransference', International Journal of Psycho-Analysis 34:4 (1953), 313-324.
 "The meanings and uses of countertransference," Psychoanalytic Quarterly 26:3 (1957), 303-357.
 Psicoanálisis del espíritu; consideraciones psicoanalíticas sobre filosofía, religión, antropología, caracterología, música, literatura, cine, Buenos Aires: Nova. A.P.A., 1957
 Übertragung und Gegenübertragung : Studien zur psychoanalytischen Technik, 1959. Translated into English as Transference and countertransference, London: Hogarth Press, 1968. International psycho-analytical library, no. 73.

References

Further reading 
 Transference and Countertransference; Publisher: Karnac Books, 1988, 

Austrian psychologists
20th-century Austrian philosophers
20th-century Argentine philosophers
Freudians
Polish emigrants to Argentina
Austrian psychoanalysts
Argentine Ashkenazi Jews
Austrian Ashkenazi Jews
Polish Ashkenazi Jews
Jewish emigrants from Austria after the Anschluss
Austrian refugees
1910 births
1961 deaths
Jewish psychoanalysts
20th-century Austrian musicologists
20th-century psychologists